Main Street or Main is a major north/south main street that runs in Kansas City, Missouri. At its northern terminus, it begins at the Missouri River as a dead end street, with heavier traffic supported as a main street south of 6th Street south to Emanuel Cleaver II Boulevard and Brookside Boulevard. The street becomes a neighborhood street south of the Plaza with interrupted service continuing to 97th Street.

Main Street serves as the main administrative north/south dividing line in the city and standardizes addresses for Kansas City, Missouri, and several surrounding suburbs. Cross-streets are labelled  "E" to the east of Main Street and "W" to the west. This should not be confused with the Kansas City "East Side" and "West Side," which is a cultural distinction separated by Troost Avenue, located approximately 1 mile east of Main Street, which has arisen from a history of racist segregation in the city.

Main Street was renamed "H And R Block Way" from 13th Street to 14th Street. It is named "Carl J. DiCapo Drive" from Pershing Road (24th Street) to 28th Street.

Route
 Commerce Tower is located at 909 Main.
 AMC Theatres former headquarters was located at 920 Main.
 10th & Main Transit Plaza is located at 10th & Main Street. 
 City Center Square is located at 1100 Main.
 Town Pavilion is located at 1111 Main.
 One Kansas City Place is located at 1200 Main.
 Midland Theatre is located at 1228 Main.
 The Power & Light District extends along Main Street from 12th Street to I-670.
 H&R Block headquarters are located at One H And R Block Way or 13th & Main Street.
 Mainstreet Theater is located at 1400 Main.
 Union Station is located at Pershing & Main Street.
 The Liberty Memorial lines the west side of Main Street from Pershing Road (24th Street) to 27th Street.
 Federal Reserve Bank of Kansas City is located at 29th & Main Street.
 The Union Hill neighborhood extends from 29th Street to 31st Terrace on Main Street.
 Midtown Marketplace is located at Linwood & Main Street.
 Interstate Bakeries Corporation world headquarters is at Armour Boulevard & Main Street.
 American Century Investments is located at 4500 Main.
 The easternmost point of the Country Club Plaza is located at Emanuel Cleaver II Boulevard & Main Street.
 Brush Creek passes under Main Street between Emanuel Cleaver II Boulevard and Volker Boulevard, as Main Street becomes Brookside Boulevard. 
 Plaza Library is located at 4801 Main.

Transit
 Kansas City Area Transportation Authority (KCATA) operates many bus routes along Main Street.
 The Metro Area Express "Orange Line," a service of the KCATA, services Main Street from Warwick Trafficway (29th Street) to Emanuel Cleaver II Boulevard.
 KC Streetcar opened for service on May 6, 2016 and operates in Downtown KCMO on Main Street from River Market to Union Station. There are plans to expand it to UMKC.

References

 Carl J. DiCapo

Transportation in Kansas City, Missouri
Streets in Kansas City, Missouri